The seignory of Lac-Mitis was a seignory during the French colonisation of New France. It was located in present-day La Mitis Regional County Municipality in Bas-Saint-Laurent. It was granted to Louis Rouer de Villeray by Louis de Buade de Frontenac, the governor of New France, on February 10, 1693.

References

New France
History of Bas-Saint-Laurent